Sontham is a 2002 Indian Telugu-language romantic comedy film released on 23 August 2002. It was directed by Srinu Vaitla. The film stars Aryan Rajesh, Rohith, Sunil, Namitha and Neha Pendse. Devi Sri Prasad has composed the score.

Plot 

Vamsy (Aryan Rajesh), Nandu (Namitha) and Bose (Rohit) are childhood friends. Vamsy and Nandu grew up very close. Bose falls in love with Sowmya (Neha pendse), one of their college mates. When Bose tells Vamsy about her, he deems it to be one more love affair that is bound to fail. Vamsy feels that friendship is more valuable than love and that love spoils a friendship. Nandu, who wanted to share her love towards Vamsy on his birthday, goes back to the shelter as she feels Vamsy might get offended.

Vamsy leaves for New Zealand to supervise the overseas operations of his father's company. In New Zealand, Vamsy realizes that he is in love with Nandu through a colleague at work, Maggy. When Vamsy returns to India, he finds out that Nandu is already engaged to Venkat (Adivi Sesh). Just before her marriage, Nandu receives a bouquet from Maggy from New Zealand addressing both Vamsy and Nandu congratulating their marriage. Realizing that Vamsy loves her, Nandu runs after him to the airport and unites with him.

Cast 

 Aryan Rajesh as Vamsi Krishna 
 Rohit as Bose
 Sunil as Seshagiri "Sesham" 
 Namitha as Nandini "Nandu"
 Neha Pendse as Sowmya
 Asha Saini as Asha
 Jhansi as Lecturer Venkatalakshmi
 M. S. Narayana as Lecturer Bogeswara Rao
 Chitram Seenu as Sesham's friend
 Ramachandra as Sesham's friend 
 Dharmavarapu Subramanyam as Subbu
 Adivi Sesh as Venkat, Nandu's fiancé
 Tanikella Bharani as Shyam Prasad, Vamsi father
 Naresh as Nandu's father
 Hema as Nandu's mother
 Neelopher as Maggie
 Telangana Shakuntala as Naga Bala, Sesham's mother
 Ali as Shambhu, Sesham's friend
 Venu Madhav as Bujji, Sesham's friend
 Jaya Prakash Reddy as Gulabi, a thief
 Chinna as Jilani, Sesham's friend
 Rajitha
 Brinda Parekh guest appearance in song "Akkado Ikkado"

Production 
Aryan Rajesh shot for this film simultaneously with Hai which released a few months prior to this film.

Soundtrack 

The music was composed by Devi Sri Prasad and was released on Aditya Music.

Box office

The film was a box office success and got special applause for comedy scenes.

References

External links 

2000s Telugu-language films
2002 films
Films directed by Srinu Vaitla

Indian buddy comedy films
2002 romantic comedy-drama films
Indian romantic comedy-drama films
Films about friendship